Anastasia Pagonis (born May 2, 2004) is an American Paralympic swimmer. She represented the United States at the 2020 Summer Paralympics. She is a world record and American record holder within the sport.

Career
Pagonis made her international debut at the 2020 WPS World Series event in Melbourne, Australia in February 2020, where she won gold in the 400 m freestyle and won bronze medal in the 200 m medley. She also finished in eighth in the 50 m freestyle and fourth in the 100 m freestyle.

At the US Paralympic trials, Pagonis set the world 400 metre freestyle S11 record twice, once during the prelims, then again during the finals. These records were not yet ratified before the 2020 Summer Paralympics began. In June 2021 it was announced that Pagonis was named to Team USA, competing in swimming at the 2020 Summer Paralympics in Tokyo, Japan.

At just 17-years-old, Pagonis represented the United States in the women's 400 metre freestyle S11 event at the 2020 Summer Paralympics where she set the S11 class world record in the preliminary heat with a time of 4:58.40. Pagonis broke the world record again during finals with a time of 4:54.49 to win gold, her first Paralympic medal and the United States' first gold medal at the Paralympics. She competed in the women's 200 metre individual medley SM11 event where she set an American record with a time of 2:45:61 and won a bronze medal.

On April 14, 2022, Pagonis was named to the roster to represent the United States at the 2022 World Para Swimming Championships. She made her World Championships debut on June 15, 2022, and won a gold medal in the 200 metre individual medley SM11 event with a time of 2:49.73.

Personal life
Pagonis' diagnosis is autoimmune retinopathy which caused her sight to deteriorate rapidly at the age of 11, and she lost her useable vision by the age of 14. She has a guide dog named Radar, which she says changed her life and helped her with the depression she had due to her vision loss. She shares videos on TikTok and Instagram educating people about blindness. Her family is from Greece.

References

External links
 
 

2004 births
Living people
American disabled sportspeople
American female freestyle swimmers
American people of Greek descent
Paralympic swimmers of the United States
S11-classified Paralympic swimmers
World record holders in paralympic swimming
Medalists at the World Para Swimming Championships
People from Long Island
Swimmers from New York (state)
Swimmers at the 2020 Summer Paralympics
Medalists at the 2020 Summer Paralympics
Paralympic medalists in swimming
Paralympic gold medalists for the United States
Paralympic bronze medalists for the United States
21st-century American women
American sportswomen
American female medley swimmers